The Scottish Premiership is the highest level club division in Scotland's national rugby union league divisions, and therefore part of the Scottish League Championship.

It contains many of the country's highest profile clubs. However it is not the highest level of rugby union in Scotland, as Edinburgh Rugby and Glasgow Warriors play against Irish, Welsh and Italian teams in the Pro14.

Some matches are shown live on BBC Alba.

Until the 2009–10 season, the bottom two teams were relegated to the Second Division. Over the subsequent two seasons, and as part of a two-phased reconstruction announced by the Scottish Rugby Council, the league moved from a 12-team league linear structure into a 10-team league pyramid structure.  From the start of the 2012–13 season  promotion/relegation between the Premiership and the newly formed National League (formerly the Second Division) is determined as follows: the winner of the National League is automatically promoted replacing the bottom placed team from the Premiership with a play-off between the 9th placed Premiership team and the 2nd placed National League team to determine the second promotion place.

The underlying principles behind league reconstruction as set out by the Season Structure Working Party of the Scottish Rugby Council were (a) to shorten the season, (b) to reduce travel costs, (c) to reduce time involved for all, (d) to assist in growing the game and (e) to retain players in the game.

The current teams playing in the Premier League are:

Premier League, 2015–16

Ayr RFC
Boroughmuir RFC
Currie RFC
Dundee HSFP
Gala RFC
Hawick RFC
Heriots RFC
Melrose RFC
Selkirk RFC
Stirling County RFC

Past winners

Hawick
Hawick 
Hawick 
Hawick
Hawick
Hawick
Heriot's FP 
Gala 
Gala 
Hawick 
Gala 
Hawick 
Hawick 
Hawick 
Hawick
Kelso 
Kelso 
Melrose 
Boroughmuir 
Melrose
Melrose 
Melrose 
Stirling County 
Melrose 
Melrose 
Watsonians 
Heriot's FP
Heriot's FP 
Hawick 
Hawick
Boroughmuir 
Glasgow Hawks 
Glasgow Hawks
Glasgow Hawks
Currie RFC
Boroughmuir 
Ayr RFC
Currie RFC
Melrose RFC
Melrose RFC
Ayr RFC
Melrose RFC
Heriot's FP

See also
 Rugby union in Scotland

References

National rugby union premier leagues
2
1973 establishments in Scotland
Recurring sporting events established in 1973

fr:Championnat d'Écosse de D1 de rugby à XV